Papanacheri is a village in the Ariyalur taluk of Ariyalur district, Tamil Nadu, India.

Demographics 

As per the 2001 census, Papanacheri had a total population of 1199 with 586 males and 613 females.

References 

Villages in Ariyalur district